Nifontov is a Russian masculine surname, its feminine counterpart is Nifontova. Notable people with the surname include:

Ivan Nifontov (born 1987), Russian judoka
Rufina Nifontova (1931–1994), Russian theater and film actress

Russian-language surnames